JBFC may refer to:

 Jacob Burns Film Center, a non-profit cultural arts center in Pleasantville, New York
 Johnstone Burgh F.C., a Scottish football club based in Johnstone, Renfrewshire